Aleksei Igorevich Prokudin (born 9 December 1982) is a former Russian professional football player.

Club career
He made his Russian Football National League debut for FC Zhemchuzhina Sochi on 8 July 2000 in a game against FC Tom Tomsk.

External links
 

1982 births
Footballers from Moscow
Living people
Russian footballers
FC Zhemchuzhina Sochi players
FC Elista players
FC Asmaral Moscow players
FC Vityaz Podolsk players
Association football forwards
Association football midfielders
FC Izhevsk players